Events in 1986 in animation.

Events

January
 January 19: The first episode of Maple Town is broadcast.

February
 February 3: Pixar is established.
 February 26: The first episode of Dragon Ball airs.

March
 March 5: Walter Lantz receives a star on the Hollywood Walk of Fame.
 March 7: The first episode of Pingu is broadcast.
 March 19: The final episode of Urusei Yatsura is broadcast.
 March 21: 
 Care Bears Movie II: A New Generation premiers.
 GoBots: Battle of the Rock Lords premiers.
 March 24: 58th Academy Awards: Anna & Bella by Børge Ring wins the Academy Award for Best Animated Short.
 March 26: The first episode of Maison Ikkoku is broadcast.

April
 April 25: Peter Gabriel releases his single Sledgehammer, of which the animated music video will become a classic.

June
 June 6: My Little Pony: The Movie premiers.
 June 27: Jim Reardon's underground cartoon Bring Me the Head of Charlie Brown is first released.

July
 July 2: The Great Mouse Detective, produced by the Walt Disney Company, is first released.

August
 August 2: Hayao Miyazaki's Castle in the Sky is released, the first film produced by Studio Ghibli.
 August 8: The Transformers: The Movie premiers.
 August 17: John Lasseter's Luxo Jr. premiers. The little lamp in the short will later become part of Pixar's logo.

September
 September 13: 
 The first episode of Foofur is broadcast.
 The first episode of Galaxy High airs.
 The first episode of Popples airs.
 The first episode of Pound Puppies airs.
 September 15: The first episode of Karate Kommandos airs, an animated TV series based on Chuck Norris.
 September 21: The first episode of Inhumanoids airs, which becomes notable for its remarkable gruesome imagery.
 September 22: The first episode of Dennis the Menace airs.

October
 October 12: The first episode of Janoschs Traumstunde airs.

November
 November 21: Don Bluth's An American Tail premiers, which marks the debut of Fievel Mousekewitz.

December
 December 3: The fifth Astérix film, Asterix in Britain, premiers.

Specific date unknown
 The Brothers Quay release Street of Crocodiles.

Films released 

 January 8 - The Trapalhoes in the Tail of the Comet (Brazil)
 January 17:
 The Adventures of the American Rabbit (United States and Japan)
 Heathcliff: The Movie (United States, Canada, and France)
 January 30 - Matthias the Just (Hungary)
 February 1 - Creamy Mami, the Magic Angel: Curtain Call (Japan)
 February 22 - Urusei Yatsura 4: Lum the Forever (Japan)
 February 23 - Seito Shokun! Kokoro ni Midori no Neckerchief wo (Japan)
 March 3 - The Humanoid (Japan)
 March 8 - Fist of the North Star (Japan)
 March 15:
 Arion (Japan)
 Doraemon: Nobita and the Steel Troops (Japan)
 Kinnikuman: Crisis in New York! (Japan)
 March 21:
 Care Bears Movie II: A New Generation (Canada and United States)
 GoBots: Battle of the Rock Lords (United States)
 Prefectural Earth Defense Force (Japan)
 March 31 - Mr. Pen Pen (Japan)
 April - Saint Elmo – Hikari no Raihousha (Japan)
 April 9 - Footrot Flats: The Dog's Tail Tale (New Zealand)
 April 12 - Touch: Sebangō no Nai Ace (Japan)
 May 12 - Tato, nie bój się dentysty! (Poland)
 May 21:
 Maris the Chojo (Japan)
 MD Geist (Japan)
 May 22 - Dot and Keeto (Australia)
 May 30:
 Kidnapping in Tiutiurlistan (Poland)
 Megazone 23 – Part II (Japan)
 June 6:
 The Cosmic Eye (United States)
 My Little Pony: The Movie (United States)
 June 7 - The Great Heep (United States)
 June 14 - Barefoot Gen 2 (Japan)
 June 19 - The Elm-Chanted Forest (Yugoslavia)
 June 21: 
 Kidnapped (Australia)
 Project A-ko (Japan)
 June 25 - King Solomon's Mines (Australia)
 July 2:
 The Adventures of Tom Sawyer (Australia)
 The Great Mouse Detective (United States)
 July 5 - Armored Trooper Votoms: The Big Battle (Japan)
 July 10 - Dr. Jekyll and Mr. Hyde (Australia)
 July 12:
 Captain Tsubasa: Sekai Daikessen!! Jr. World Cup (Japan)
 GeGeGe no Kitarō: Saikyō Yōkai Gundan! Nihon jōriku!! (Japan)
 July 19:
 Amon Saga (Japan)
 Itoshi no Betty Mamonogatari (Japan)
 Windaria (Japan)
 July 20:
 Dokkaebi bangmang-i (South Korea)
 Running Boy: Star Soldier's Secret (Japan)
 Super Mario Bros.: The Great Mission to Rescue Princess Peach (Japan)
 July 25 - Robotech: The Movie (United States and Japan)
 July 26:
 Ai City (Japan)
 Gall Force: Eternal Story (Japan)
 July 31 - Nayuta (Japan)
 August 2:
 Castle in the Sky (Japan)
 Meitantei Holmes: Mrs. Hudson Hitojichi Jiken / Dover Kaikyō no Daikūchūsen! (Japan)
 August 8 - The Transformers: The Movie (United States and Japan)
 August 22:
 Coral Reef Legend: Elfie of the Blue Sea (Japan)
 Sangokushi II: Amakakeru otoko-tachi (Japan)
 August 24 - Galaxy Investigation 2100: Border Planet (Japan)
 August 27 - Eleven Hungry Cats and an Albatross (Japan)
 September 5 - Majo demo Steady (Japan)
 September 10:
 Roots Search (Japan)
 Voltron: Fleet of Doom (United States and Japan)
 September 14 - Ivanhoe (Australia)
 September 20 - The New Adventures of Monica and Her Friends (Brazil)
 October 2 - Cat City (Hungary, Canada, and West Germany)
 October 4 - The Three Musketeers (Australia)
 October 10 - Valhalla (Denmark)
 October 18 – November 1, 1986 - Liberty and the Littles (United States)
 October 24 - When the Wind Blows (United Kingdom)
 October 30 - Dot and the Whale (Australia)
 November 1:
 Opening the Door (Japan)
 They Were Eleven (Japan)
 November 20 - Asterix in Britain (France)
 November 21 - An American Tail (United States and Ireland)
 November 27 - Fluppy Dogs (United States)
 November 28:
 Dirty Pair: Project Eden (Japan)
 Urban Square – Kohaku no Tsuigeki (Japan)
 December 5 - Bolek and Lolek in the Wild West (Poland)
 December 13:
 Grey: Digital Target (Japan)
 Guyver: Out of Control (Japan)
 Touch 2: Sayonara no Okurimono (Japan)
 December 16 - Outlanders (Japan)
 December 19 - Ratty (Sweden)
 December 20:
 Dragon Ball: Curse of the Blood Rubies (Japan)
 Gaksital (South Korea)
 GeGeGe no Kitarō: Gekitotsu! I jigen yōkai no dai hanran (Japan)
 Kinnikuman: Justice Supermen vs. Fighter Supermen (Japan)
 Phoenix: Karma Chapter (Japan)
 December 21:
 Delpower X Explosion Miracle Genki!! (Japan)
 The Hunchback of Notre Dame (Australia)
 December 25 - Wanna-Be's (Japan)
 December 29 - Mr. Pen Pen II (Japan)
 Specific date unknown: 
 The Great Cheese Conspiracy (Czechoslovakia and West Germany)
 Inhumanoids: The Movie (United States)
 Salar (Czechoslovakia)
 Skeletor's Revenge (United States)
 Sophie's Place (United States)

Television series 

 January 6:
 Jimbo and the Jet Set debuts on BBC One.
 Telebugs debuts on ITV.
 January 10 - Spaceship Sagittarius debuts on TV Asahi.
 January 12 - The Story of Pollyanna, Girl of Love debuts on Fuji TV, Animax.
 January 19 - Maple Town debuts on TV Asahi.
 February 26 - Dragon Ball debuts on FNS (Fuji TV).
 March 1 - Mobile Suit Gundam ZZ debuts on Nagoya TV, TV Asahi.
 March 7 - Pastel Yumi, the Magic Idol debuts on NTV.
 March 26 - Maison Ikkoku debuts on FNS (Fuji TV).
 March 31 - Mister Pen-Pen debuts in syndication.
 April - Kideo TV debuts in syndication.
 April 3 - The Raggy Dolls debuts on ITV Network / CITV.
 April 7:
 Ginga: Nagareboshi Gin debuts on TV Asahi.
 The Centurions debuts in syndication.
 April 16 - Wonder Beat Scramble debuts on TBS.
 April 22 - The Blunders debuts on ITV.
 April 25 - Seishun Anime Zenshu debuts in syndication.
 May 3 - Hikari no Densetsu debuts on ANN (TV Asahi).
 May 28 - Pingu debuts on SF DRS (Switzerland) and CBeebies (United Kingdom).
 June 29 - Inhumanoids debuts in syndication.
 July 3 - Machine Robo: Revenge of Cronos debuts on TV Tokyo.
 September 6 - The Flintstone Kids debuts on ABC.
 September 8 - Defenders of the Earth, Ghostbusters, and Silverhawks debut in syndication.
 September 13:
 Foofur, Lazer Tag Academy, and Kissyfur debut on NBC.
 Galaxy High, Teen Wolf, and Wildfire debut on CBS.
 Popples debuts in syndication.
 Pound Puppies debuts on ABC.
 Teen Wolf debuts on CBS.
 The Real Ghostbusters debuts on ABC and in syndication.
 The Care Bears Family debuts on Global Television Network.
 September 14 - The Adventures of the Galaxy Rangers and The New Adventures of Jonny Quest debut in syndication.
 September 15: Chuck Norris: Karate Kommandos and Rambo: The Force of Freedom debut in syndication.
 September 22 - Dennis the Menace debuts in syndication (1986-1987) and CBS (1988).
 September 23 - The Glo Friends debuts in syndication.
 September 24 - Potato Head Kids debuts in syndication.
 September 25 - MoonDreamers debuts in syndication.
 October 3 - Bug-Tte Honey and Heart Cocktail debut on NTV.
 October 5 - Anmitsu Hime debuts on Fuji TV, RAB, and YBS.
 October 6:
 Bosco Adventure debuts on Yomiuri TV.
 The Wonderful Wizard of Oz and Oh! Family debut on TV Tokyo.
 October 7 - The Bluffers debuts on AVRO.
 October 11 - Saint Seiya debuts on TV Asahi.
 October 12 - Janoschs Traumstunde debuts on ARD and KiKa.
 October 14 - Doteraman debuts on NTV.
 October 15:
 Dorimogu Daa!! debuts in syndication.
 Ganbare Kickers debuts on NTV.
 December 24 - The Adventures of Teddy Ruxpin debuts in syndication.
 Specific date unknown: 
 Dick Spanner, P.I. debuts on Channel 4.
 G-Force: Guardians of Space debuts on TBS.

Births

January
 January 4: Charlyne Yi, American actor (voice of Ruby in the Steven Universe franchise, Chloe Park in We Bare Bears, Alice in Summer Camp Island, Mai Su in Next Gen, Pennywhistle in Trolls World Tour, Abbey Posey in The Mitchells vs. the Machines, the Guardian in the Amphibia episode "The Hardest Thing").
 January 6:
 Stu Livingston, American animator, storyboard artist (Pink Panther & Pals, Good Vibes, Napoleon Dynamite, Futurama, Cartoon Network Studios, Penn Zero: Part-Time Hero, The Owl House, The Loud House, Disenchantment), writer (Craig of the Creek) and director (Hey Arnold!: The Jungle Movie, Craig of the Creek, The Owl House).
 Shane Sweet, American actor (voice of Tim Drake / Robin in the Static Shock episode "Future Shock", additional voices in The Mitchells vs. the Machines, 3Below: Tales of Arcadia, Big Hero 6, Arcane, What If...?, Spies in Disguise, and The Star).
 January 7: Luke Ruegger, American former voice actor and son of Tom Ruegger (voice of Big Fat Baby in Histeria!, the Flame and Bumpo in Animaniacs).

 January 8: Jaclyn Linetsky, Canadian actress (voice of the title character in Caillou, Meg in Mega Babies, second voice of Lori in What's with Andy?), (d. 2003).
 January 12: Dominique Moore, English actress (voice of Flo in Floogals, Lulu in Sadie Sparks, Ruth in Thomas & Friends).

February
 February 14: Justin Michael, American actor (voice of Tex Jr., Mr. Weaselbrat and Robby Burgles in Buddy Thunderstruck, Funshine Bear in Care Bears: Unlock the Magic, Kevin, Soldier Turtle, Turtle Guard and Roy in Infinity Train, Boy in Boy Girl Dog Cat Mouse Cheese, Nevin in The Fungies!), writer (Infinity Train), producer and director (Cake).
 February 15: Ami Koshimizu, Japanese actress (voice of Ryuko Matoi in Kill la Kill, Makoto Kino / Sailor Jupiter in Sailor Moon Crystal, Kallen Stadtfeld in Code Geass, Hibiki Houjou / Cure Melody in Suite PreCure).
 February 24: Bryce Papenbrook, American actor (voice of Kirito in Sword Art Online, Eren Yeager in Attack on Titan, Inosuke Hashibira in Demon Slayer: Kimetsu no Yaiba, Rin Okumura in Blue Exorcist, Masaomi Kida in Durarara!!, Caesar Anthonio Zeppeli in JoJo's Bizarre Adventure, Shirou Emiya in Fate/stay night: Unlimited Blade Works, Meliodas and Zeldris in The Seven Deadly Sins, Red in Pokémon Origins, Kaito in Ajin: Demi-Human, Makoto Naegi and Nagito Komaeda in Danganronpa, Lance in Glitter Force Doki Doki, Adrien Agreste/Cat Noir and Félix Fathom in Miraculous: Tales of Ladybug & Cat Noir).
 February 25: 
 Justin Berfield, American former actor, writer and producer (voice of Gill in Kim Possible, Ving in The Fairly OddParents episode "Crash Nebula").
 Jameela Jamil, British actress (voice of Gandra Dee in DuckTales, Wonder Woman in DC League of Super-Pets, Auntie Pushpa in Mira, Royal Detective, Roxie in Jurassic World Camp Cretaceous, Ensign Asencia in Star Trek: Prodigy, Buttercup in the Robot Chicken episode "Mushya Shakhtyorov in: Honeyboogers", Christine S. in the American Dad! episode "Exquisite Corpses", Sultana in the Animaniacs episode "1001 Narfs", Lady De-Clutter in the Rugrats episode of the same name, Eris in the Harley Quinn episode "Bachelorette").
 February 28: Yūko Sanpei, Japanese actress and voice actress (voice of Nozomi Yumehara/Cure Dream in Yes! PreCure 5, Boruto Uzumaki in Boruto: Naruto Next Generation).

March
 March 6: Eli Marienthal, American actor (voice of Hogarth Hughes in The Iron Giant, Tim Drake/Robin in Batman: Mystery of the Batwoman and the Static Shock episode "The Big Leagues").
 March 12: Debora Arroyo, American design coordinator (Pink Panther and Pals, Futurama), production manager (The Ricky Gervais Show, Infinity Train), production coordinator (The Ricky Gervais Show, Good Vibes, Clarence) and producer (We Baby Bears).
 March 13: Emily Brundige, American voice actress (voice of Sara in Over the Garden Wall, Molly in Too Loud!, Stacy in Ollie & Scoops), production intern (China, IL) and television writer (The Powerpuff Girls, Warner Bros. Animation, Home: Adventures with Tip & Oh, Harvey Girls Forever!, Amphibia, Hilda, Big Nate).
 March 28: 
Lady Gaga, American musician and actress (voiced herself in The Simpsons episode "Lisa Goes Gaga").
 Meagan Smith, American voice actress (voice of Gwen Tennyson in Ben 10).

April
 April 3: Amanda Bynes, American actress (voice of Taffy and Princess in Rugrats, Nellie in Charlotte's Web 2: Wilbur's Great Adventure, Piper in Robots, Anna in the Family Guy episode "Long John Peter").

May
 May 11: Sean Jara, Canadian-born American cartoonist and animator.
 May 17: Tahj Mowry, American actor (voice of Wade Load in Kim Possible, young Sonic in the Sonic the Hedgehog episode "Blast to the Past").

June
 June 11: Shia LaBeouf, American actor, performance artist and filmmaker (voice of Cody Maverick in Surf's Up, Asbel in Nausicaä of the Valley of the Wind, Johnny McBride in The Proud Family episode "I Love You Penny Proud").
 June 13:
 Mary-Kate Olsen, American fashion designer and former actress (voiced herself in Mary-Kate and Ashley in Action! and The Simpsons episode "Diatribe of a Mad Housewife").
 Ashley Olsen, American fashion designer, businesswoman and former actress (voiced herself in Mary-Kate and Ashley in Action! and The Simpsons episode "Diatribe of a Mad Housewife").
 June 18: Natasha Allegri, American animation creator,  writer, storyboard artist, and comic book artist (Bee and Puppycat, Adventure Time).
 June 24: Solange Knowles, American singer, songwriter and actress (voice of Chanel in The Proud Family episode "Behind Family Lines").
 June 27: Drake Bell, American actor (voice of Spider-Man in The Avengers: Earth's Mightiest Heroes, Ultimate Spider-Man, Avengers Assemble, Hulk and the Agents of S.M.A.S.H., and the Phineas and Ferb episode "Phineas and Ferb: Mission Marvel", Michael Morningstar in Ben 10).
 June 28:
 Suzuko Mimori, Japanese actress (voice of Umi Sonoda in Love Live!, Asumi Fuurin / Cure Earth in Healin' Good Pretty Cure, Japanese dub voice of Pinkie Pie in My Little Pony: Friendship is Magic).
 Ian Hanlin, Canadian actor (voice of Sunburst in My Little Pony: Friendship Is Magic, Acronix in Ninjago, Fire Man and Air Man in Mega Man: Fully Charged).

July
 July 21: Diane Guerrero, American actress (voice of Jessica Cruz in Justice League vs. the Fatal Five, Vestia in Elena of Avalor, Isabela Madrigal in Encanto).

August
 August 13: Ashley Spillers, American actress (voice of Didi Pickles in Rugrats, Jill the Frog in Muppet Babies, June Moore in DC Super Hero Girls).
 August 17: Bryton James, American actor (voice of Static in Young Justice, Roy in Winx Club, Zare Leonis in Star Wars Rebels, Mark Surge in Hero Factory, Jason James / Z-Strap in Zevo-3).
 August 28: Armie Hammer, American actor (voice of Jackson Storm in Cars 3, Zook in The Polar Bears, Strong Arm in Stan Lee's Mighty 7, Cameron and Tyler Winklevoss in The Simpsons episode "The D'oh-cial Network", Car Rental Agent in the American Dad episode "The Wrestler").
 August 29: Lea Michele, American actress, singer, songwriter and author (voice of Christina in Buster & Chauncey's Silent Night, Dorothy in Legends of Oz: Dorothy's Return, Rachel Berry in The Cleveland Show episode "How Do You Solve a Problem Like Roberta?", herself in The Simpsons episode "Elementary School Musical").
 August 31: Spencer Klein, American former child actor (voice of Arnold in seasons 4-5 of Hey Arnold! and Hey Arnold!: The Movie, George and Robert Chestnut in Fillmore!).

September
 September 16: Kyla Pratt, American actress (voice of Penny Proud in The Proud Family franchise).

October
 October 1: Sayaka Kanda, Japanese actress and singer (Japanese dub voice of Anna in the Frozen franchise), (d. 2021).
 October 23: Emilia Clarke, English actress (voice of Marianne in the Futurama episode "Stench and Stenchibility", Bridget in the Robot Chicken episode "Joel Hurwitz Returns", Lumpy in the Animals episode "Rats.", Doyle in the Thunderbirds Are Go episode "Rigged for Disaster").
 October 24:
 Drake, Canadian rapper, singer, and actor (voice of Ethan in Ice Age: Continental Drift).
 Nobuhiko Okamoto, Japanese voice actor and singer (voice of Rin Okumura in Blue Exorcist, Accelerator in A Certain Magical Index, Mikoto "Mikorin" Mikoshiba in Monthly Girls' Nozaki-kun, Katsuki Bakugo in My Hero Academia, Karma Akabane in Ansatsu Kyoshitsu, Yū Nishinoya in Haikyū, Shū Inuzuka in Shikimori's Not Just a Cutie).
 October 28: May Calamawy, Egyptian-Palestinian actress (voice of Fawiza in the Moon Girl and Devil Dinosaur episode "Goodnight, Moon Girl").

December
 December 23: Noël Wells, American actress (voice of Lord Dominator in Wander Over Yonder, Kelsey Pokoly in Craig of the Creek, Ensign D'Vana Tendi in Star Trek: Lower Decks, June in the DuckTales episode "The Last Adventure!").
 December 26: Kit Harington, English actor (voice of Eret in the How to Train Your Dragon franchise).
 December 29: Ally Maki, American actress (voice of Giggle McDimples in Toy Story 4, Viney in The Owl House, Haruka in Hit-Monkey).

Specific date unknown
 Jonathan Gales, English animator and creative director (co-founder of Factory Fifteen), (d. 2022).

Deaths

January
 January 7: P. D. Eastman, American screenwriter, children's author, and illustrator (Private Snafu, UPA), dies at age 76.
 January 23: Frank Grundeen, American animator and comics artist (Walt Disney Company), dies at age 74.

February
 February 16: Andrzej Pawłowski, Polish painter, sculptor, photographer, and film director (Kineformy, Naturally Shaped Forms, Mannequins), dies at age 60.
 February 17: Paul Stewart, American actor (voice of Mighty Mightor), dies at age 77.

March
 March 16: George Jackson, English animator (Watership Down, The Plague Dogs, Danger Mouse, The BFG), dies at age 64.
 March 25: Gloria Blondell, American actress (second voice of Daisy Duck in several Donald Duck cartoons), dies at age 70.

April
 April 2: Jack Manning, American comics artist and animator (Walt Disney Company, Hanna-Barbera), dies at age 65.
 April 19: Alvin Childress, American actor (voice of Jasper in Puppetoons), dies at age 78.
 April 22: Dick Moores, American comics artist and animator (Telecomics Inc.), dies at age 75.
 April 30: Robert Stevenson, English film director (Mary Poppins, Bedknobs and Broomsticks), dies at age 81.

May
 May 1: Arthur Lipsett, Canadian film director and animator (Very Nice, Very Nice, 21-87, A Trip Down Memory Lane), commits suicide at age 49.
 May 9: Herschel Bernardi, American actor (voice of Charlie the Tuna and The Jolly Green Giant), dies at age 62.
 May 24: George Gordon, American animator and film director (Terrytoons, MGM, Hanna-Barbera), dies at age 79.

June
 June 13: Benny Goodman, American jazz band leader (provided music to the All the Cats Join In and After You've Gone segments in Make Mine Music), dies at age 77.

August
 August 19: Hermione Baddeley, English actress (voice of Madame Adelaide Bonfamille in The Aristocats, Auntie Shrew in The Secret of NIMH), dies at age 79.
 August 26: Ted Knight, American actor (voice of Commander Jonathan Kidd in Fantastic Voyage, Black Manta in The Superman/Aquaman Hour of Adventure, Commissioner Gordon, Penguin, Riddler, Mr. Freeze, Scarecrow, and Mad Hatter in The Adventures of Batman, narrator and the Flash in Super Friends, Ben Turner in Lassie's Rescue Rangers, Carter Winston/Vendorian in the Star Trek: The Animated Series episode "The Survivor"), dies at age 62.

September
 September 12: Frank Nelson, American comedic actor (voice of Mr. Cow in Tootsie Pop commercials, Uncle Dudley in Dinky Dog, Tall Doctor in Puff the Magic Dragon, Wizzar in Monchhichis, Governor Wetworth in Snorks, Dr. Pavlov in Foofur, Satan in The Looney Looney Looney Bugs Bunny Movie), dies at age 75.
 September 15: Virginia Gregg, American actress (voice of Tara in The Herculoids), dies at age 70.

October
 October 11: David Hand, American animator and film director (Walt Disney Company, Gaumont), dies at age 86.
 October 14: Keenan Wynn, American actor (voice of the Winter Warlock in Santa Claus Is Comin' to Town, Captain Cully and the Harpy in The Last Unicorn), dies at age 70.

November
 November 2: Paul Frees, American actor and screenwriter (voice of Boris Badenov in Rocky and Bullwinkle, Inspector Fenwick in Dudley Do-Right, Ludwig von Drake in Disney anthology television series, Muscles in Jerry's Cousin, John Lennon and George Harrison in The Beatles, Burgermeister Meisterburger and Grimsley in Santa Claus Is Comin' to Town), dies at age 66.
 November 11: Roger C. Carmel, American actor (voice of Cyclonus and Unicron in The Transformers, Harry Mudd in the Star Trek: The Animated Series episode "Mudd's Passion", Sultan in the DuckTales episode "Master of the Djinni", continued voice of Sir Tuxford in Adventures of the Gummi Bears, additional voices in The Berenstain Bears and The New Adventures of Jonny Quest), dies at age 54.
 November 22: 
 Jerry Colonna, American comedian, singer and musician and actor (narrator of the Casey at the Bat segment in Make Mine Music and the short The Brave Engineer, voice of the March Hare in Alice in Wonderland), dies at age 82. 
 Scatman Crothers, American voice actor (voice of Scat Cat in The Aristocats, Meadowlark Lemon in Harlem Globetrotters, Hong Kong Phooey in Hong Kong Phooey, Old Man Bone in Coonskin, Jazz in The Transformers), dies at age 76.
 November 23:
 Norman Maurer, American comics artist, animator, screenwriter, and film producer (Hanna-Barbera), dies at age 60 from cancer.
 Frank Smith, American animator and comics artist (Walt Disney Company, Harman-Ising), dies at age 78.
 November 25: Don Towsley, American animator (Walt Disney Company, Hanna-Barbera, Chuck Jones, Filmation), dies at age 74. 
 November 29: Herb Vigran, American actor (voice of narrator in What's My Lion?, Glum in The Adventures of Gulliver, Lurvy in Charlotte's Web, Museum Man in The Super Globetrotters episode "The Super Globetrotters vs. Museum Man", Mr. Dinkle in Shirt Tales, Hopps in Starchaser: The Legend of Orin, additional voices in The Plastic Man Comedy/Adventure Show and Saturday Supercade), dies at age 76.

December
 December 12: Carlos Ramírez, Colombian singer (opera voice in Tex Avery's Magical Maestro), dies at age 70. 
 December 13: Heather Angel, English actress (voice of Alice's sister in Alice in Wonderland, Mrs. Darling in Peter Pan), dies at age 77.
 December 31: Elmer Plummer, American painter and animator (Warner Bros. Cartoons, Walt Disney Studios), dies at age 76.

Specific date unknown
 Isadore Klein, American animator and screenwriter (Terrytoons, Walt Disney Animation Studios, Famous Studios), dies at age 88.

See also
1986 in anime

References

External links 
Animated works of the year, listed in the IMDb

 
1980s in animation